Air Tahoma Flight 185 was a scheduled cargo flight from Memphis to Cincinnati/Northern Kentucky International Airport conducted by Air Tahoma as part of a contract to freight parcels for courier firm DHL. On August 13, 2004, the flight crashed during approach to landing just one mile short of the runway. The Convair 580, which is a twin engine turboprop, was destroyed upon impact. The first officer was killed and the captain received minor injuries.

History of the flight

On August 13, 2004 at about 00:49 Eastern Daylight Time, Air Tahoma, Inc., Flight 185 crashed about one mile south of Cincinnati/Northern Kentucky International Airport (CVG), in Florence, Kentucky while on approach to runway 36R. The crash was heard by a nearby Florence Police officer. Shortly after, first responders found the plane. The first officer was killed and the captain received minor injuries. The airplane was destroyed by impact forces. The flight was operating as a cargo flight for DHL Express from Memphis International Airport to CVG. Visual meteorological conditions prevailed for the flight, which operated on an instrument flight rules flight plan.

Official investigation
The National Transportation Safety Board determined that the probable cause of this accident was fuel starvation resulting from the captain's decision not to follow approved fuel crossfeed procedures. Different output pressure settings on the fuel boost pumps coupled with the open crossfeed valve resulted in both engines drawing fuel from the left tank. All of the fuel from the airplane's left tank that was not used by the engines was transferred into the right tank due to the pressure differential between the boost pumps. During the airplane's descent to landing, the fuel in the left fuel tank became exhausted. Both engine-driven fuel pumps drew air from the exhausted left tank into the fuel system, resulting in a dual-engine flameout.

Contributing to the accident were the captain's inadequate preflight planning, his subsequent distraction during the flight, and his late initiation of the in-range checklist. Further contributing to the accident was the flight crew's failure to monitor the fuel gauges and to recognize that the airplane's changing handling characteristics were caused by a fuel imbalance.

References

External links
Air Tahoma, Inc., Flight 185 Aircraft Accident Report
NTSB brief DCA04MA068

Accidents and incidents involving the Convair CV-240 family
2004 in Kentucky
Airliner accidents and incidents in Kentucky
Airliner accidents and incidents caused by fuel starvation
Airliner accidents and incidents caused by pilot error
Aviation accidents and incidents in the United States in 2004
August 2004 events in the United States
Cincinnati/Northern Kentucky International Airport
DHL